Adan Yabal District is a district in the southeastern Middle Shabelle (Shabeellaha Dhexe) region of Somalia. Adan Yabaal was established in 1942.

References

External links
 Districts of Somalia
 Administrative map of Adan-Yabal District

Districts of Somalia

Middle Shabelle